Ilex × attenuata, the topal holly, is the result of a cross between Ilex cassine (dahoon) and Ilex opaca (American holly). It is a naturally occurring hybrid found in the southeastern United States where the ranges of the parents overlap, but hybrid cultivars have also been created. The best known cultivars are 'Fosteri', Foster holly, which does not require males to set fruit, and 'Savannah', with very showy red fruit.

References

attenuata
Interspecific plant hybrids
Ornamental plant cultivars
Ornamental trees
Plants described in 1924